The Barry 10 was a collection of unsold scrapyard steam locomotives that were removed from Woodham Brothers in 1990 when Dai Woodham retired.

They were then taken on by the Vale of Glamorgan Council. For the next 20 years, the locomotives were stored in scrapyard condition, although several were bought. All the remaining locomotives were rusting hulks, stored, and not publicly viewable.

Ownership
The Barry Ten were under the management and ownership of Cambrian Transport, who publicly announced, on 4 May 2010, various plans for the different engines (see below).

Locomotive list

References

External links
 Vale of Glamorgan Railway - Detailed list of the 'Barry Ten'
 Railway fans steam ahead with restoration bid
Plans to restore and exhibit historic Barry steam locomotives announced
 Barry 10
 The Barry 10
 Photo of "Barry 10" 44901
 Photo of three  "Barry 10" locomotives

Locomotives saved from Woodham Brothers scrapyard
Steam locomotives of Great Britain
Preserved steam locomotives of Great Britain